José Carlos Fernández Vázquez (born 17 July 1987), known as José Carlos, is a Spanish professional footballer who plays as a left winger or a forward.

Club career

Sevilla
Born in Minas de Ríotinto, Province of Huelva, José Carlos grew in Sevilla FC's youth system, making his first-team debut on 15 February 2009 as he played two minutes in a 2–0 away win against RCD Espanyol. He added five more the following week, in the 1–0 home victory over Atlético Madrid also in La Liga.

On 3 April 2010, as a second-half substitute, José Carlos scored his first league goal for Sevilla in their 3–0 home defeat of CD Tenerife. Previously, in that season's Copa del Rey against CF Atlético Ciudad, he had netted twice in a 5–1 home rout.

AEK Athens
With the arrival of new coach Gregorio Manzano, José Carlos fell out favour and was sent on loan to FC Cartagena in Segunda División, until June 2011. He agreed terms with AEK Athens F.C. late into that month, signing a one-year deal with the Greek club and reuniting with former Sevilla coach (main squad and reserves) Manuel Jiménez as well as teammate Cala.

José Carlos scored his first competitive goal for AEK against FC Dinamo Tbilisi in a UEFA Europa League qualifier, the game's only in a home fixture. He added a second in the same competition – 1–2 group stage home loss to SK Sturm Graz– as the team only earned three points in six matches.

Rayo Vallecano
In July 2012, José Carlos returned to Spain and joined Rayo Vallecano of the top division. After being regularly used in his first season, he suffered a serious knee injury which took him out of the majority of the following.

Córdoba
On 12 July 2014, José Carlos signed a one-year deal with Córdoba CF who had just promoted to the top flight. His first and only appearance for the side occurred on 25 October 2014, and it consisted of 18 minutes in a 1–1 home draw against Real Sociedad; a day later, he again suffered an injury.

José Carlos terminated his contract on 13 November 2014.

Later career
On 9 December 2015, after trials at Recreativo de Huelva and UE Llagostera, José Carlos signed a short-term deal with the latter club. He contributed 557 minutes during the campaign, and his team suffered relegation from second tier.

José Carlos moved to Gimnàstic de Tarragona on 5 July 2016, on a one-year contract.

References

External links

1987 births
Living people
Sportspeople from the Province of Huelva
Spanish footballers
Footballers from Andalusia
Association football wingers
Association football forwards
La Liga players
Segunda División players
Segunda División B players
Tercera División players
Sevilla FC C players
Sevilla Atlético players
Sevilla FC players
FC Cartagena footballers
Rayo Vallecano players
Córdoba CF players
UE Costa Brava players
Gimnàstic de Tarragona footballers
CD Castellón footballers
Recreativo de Huelva players
Super League Greece players
AEK Athens F.C. players
Spanish expatriate footballers
Expatriate footballers in Greece
Spanish expatriate sportspeople in Greece